Bourma is a town in the Boudry Department of Ganzourgou Province in central Burkina Faso. The town has a population of 4,079.

References

Populated places in the Plateau-Central Region
Ganzourgou Province